Robert Krawczyk (born 26 March 1978, in Tarnowskie Góry) is a Polish judoka.

Achievements

References

External links
 
 

1978 births
Living people
Polish male judoka
Judoka at the 2000 Summer Olympics
Judoka at the 2004 Summer Olympics
Judoka at the 2008 Summer Olympics
Olympic judoka of Poland
People from Tarnowskie Góry
Sportspeople from Silesian Voivodeship